Yvonne Wansart (born 21 May 1974) is a German judoka. She competed in the women's middleweight event at the 2000 Summer Olympics.

References

External links
 

1974 births
Living people
German female judoka
Olympic judoka of Germany
Judoka at the 2000 Summer Olympics
Sportspeople from Cologne